"Morning Star" is a popular American Moravian Church carol with text originating as a poem by Johannes Scheffler in 1657, to music composed by Francis F. Hagen in 1836.

References

1836 songs